Zoratu Bala (also Romanized as Z̄oratū Bālā and Zartū-ye Bālā; also known as Zaztoo, Z̄orratū, and Zūrātū) is a village in Gohreh Rural District, Fin District, Bandar Abbas County, Hormozgan Province, Iran. At the 2006 census, its population was 61, in 23 families.

References 

Populated places in Bandar Abbas County